Saint-Octave-de-Métis is a parish municipality in Quebec, Canada.

Demographics 

Notable people 

 Jules-André Brillant, born 1888, baptized and educated in Saint-Octave-de-Métis, French Canadian entrepreneur
 Hormisdas Langlais, born 1890, Canadian politician and a seven-term Member of the Legislative Assembly of Quebec
 Marguerite Ruest-Pitre, born 1908, Canadian murderer also known as "Madame le Corbeau", last woman criminal executed in Canada (1953)
 Marie-Thérèse Fortin, born 1959, Canadian actress
 Anaïs Favron, born 1977, radio and TV host, actress, and improviser

See also
 List of parish municipalities in Quebec

References

External links
 

Parish municipalities in Quebec
Incorporated places in Bas-Saint-Laurent